Addams is a crater  on Venus. It was named after Jane Addams.

References

Impact craters on Venus